Darcy Rae Fast (born March 10, 1947) is an American former professional baseball player, a left-handed pitcher in the Major Leagues in 1968 for the Chicago Cubs.

Fast's only MLB decision was on July 4, 1968, pitching in relief in the second game of a doubleheader when the Cubs hosted the Philadelphia Phillies. Surrendering 4 runs in 3 innings of work, he was the losing pitcher in the 7–4 loss.

Fast appeared in eight MLB games for the Cubs, and struck out ten batters in ten innings pitched. He also walked eight and gave up six earned runs and eight hits. His professional career lasted four seasons, from 1967–70.

Fast worked as a pastor for 30 years following his baseball career.

References

External links

1947 births
Living people
Baseball players from Oregon
Caldwell Cubs players
Chicago Cubs players
Lodi Crushers players
Major League Baseball pitchers
People from Dallas, Oregon
Salt Lake City Bees players
Tacoma Cubs players
Warner Pacific Knights baseball players